Galbadrakhyn Khishigsaikhan (born 28 August 1990) is a Mongolian long distance runner. She competed in the women's marathon at the 2017 World Championships in Athletics. In 2019, she competed in the women's marathon at the 2019 World Athletics Championships held in Doha, Qatar. She finished in 25th place.

References

External links

1990 births
Living people
Mongolian female long-distance runners
Mongolian female marathon runners
World Athletics Championships athletes for Mongolia
Place of birth missing (living people)
Athletes (track and field) at the 2018 Asian Games
Asian Games competitors for Mongolia
21st-century Mongolian women